Debreceni Vasutas Sport Club is a professional football club, based in Debrecen, Hungary, that competes in the Nemzeti Bajnokság I, the first tier of Hungarian football. They are best known internationally for reaching the group stages of the UEFA Champions League in the 2009–10 season. Debrecen have become the most successful club in Hungary since 2000, winning the Hungarian League seven times.

History

Debrecen was founded on 12 March 1902 as Debreceni Vasutas Sport Club. The club first reached the Nemzeti Bajnokság I in the 1943–44 season. Debrecen rose to domestic prominence in the early 2000s when they won their first Hungarian league title in 2004–05 season. Since then the club managed to win seven titles in the 2010s total. However, in the late 2010s the club lost its governmental support and started to decline. In the 2016–17 Nemzeti Bajnokság I, they were escaping from relegation.

At international level, Debrecen reached their biggest success when they managed to reach the 2009–10 UEFA Champions League group stage. The following year they reached the group stages of the 2010–11 UEFA Europa League.

Crest and colours

Naming history
 1902–12: Egyetértés Football Club
 1912–48: Debreceni Vasutas
 1948–49: Debreceni Vasutas Sport Egyesület
 1949–55: Debreceni Lokomotív
 1955–56: Debreceni Törekvés
 1957–79: Debreceni Vasutas Sport Club
 1979–89: Debreceni Munkás Vasutas Sport Club
 1989–95: Debreceni Vasutas Sport Club
 1995–99: DVSC-Epona
 1999–01: Debreceni VSC
 2001–02: Netforum-DVSC
 2002: Debreceni VSC
 2003–05: DVSC-MegaForce
 2005–06: DVSC-AVE Ásványvíz
 2006–16: DVSC-TEVA
 2016–: Debreceni Vasutas Sport Club

Manufacturers and shirt sponsors
The following table shows in detail Debreceni VSC kit manufacturers and shirt sponsors by year:

Stadiums and facilities

Debrecen played their home matches between 1989 and 2014 at the Oláh Gábor utcai Stadion, which has a capacity of 12,500. After winning the first Nemzeti Bajnokság I trophy, it was found that the stadium did not meet UEFA stadium criteria. Therefore, the most important UEFA Champions League and UEFA Europa League matches had to be played at the Ferenc Puskás Stadium as in 2009–10 UEFA Champions League group stage and the 2010–11 UEFA Europa League group stage.

On 1 May 2014, the Nagyerdei stadium was opened with an inauguration ceremony. Viktor Orbán, Hungarian prime minister, said that "the Hungarian spirit, the architects, the engineers, the workers make Hungary great again with this constructions like the Nagyerdei stadium" (in Hungarian: "A magyar szellem, a tervezők, a mérnökök, a munkások ilyen alkotásokkal teszik ismét naggyá Magyarországot"). The stadium was also sanctified by Nándor Bosák, bishop of the Roman Catholic Church, Gusztáv Bölcskei, minister, and Fülöp Kocsis, bishops of the Greek Catholic Church. After the sanctification, singers such as Lou Bega, Viktor Király, Ildikó Kersztes, Gigi Radić, and Erika Miklósa entertained the audience. The first match was played between the Debrecen All Stars and Hungary All Stars, including players such as Attila Pintér, current Hungary national football team coach, Kálmán Kovács, former Budapest Honvéd legend, Péter Lipcsei, former Ferencváros icon, György Véber, former Újpest icon and Mezőkövesd manager at that time, Imre Garaba, former Hungary international, Flórián Urbán, former Újpest legend, and Lajos Détári, former Hungary national team legend.

On 10 May 2014, the first official match was played at the new stadium between Debrecen and Újpest in the 2013–14 Hungarian League season. The match ended with a 3–1 victory over the Budapest-based rival, Újpest. The first goal of the match was scored by Kulcsár in the 27th minute. Although Vasiljević equalised the score in the 37th minute, Debrecen were able to clinch the victory in the second half due to an own goal by Antón in the 46-minute and a goal by Vadnai in the 85th minute.

On 22 May 2014, the first match of the Hungary national football team was played at the stadium in front of 20,000 spectators, which ended with a 2–2 draw against Denmark national football team. The first goal was scored by the former Debrecen player Dzsudzsák. Eriksen equalised the score in the 56th minute. The debutant Varga took the lead in the 69th minute again, but the score was equalised by Schöne in the 72nd minute.

Supporters
Supporters of DVSC are mainly based in Debrecen, Hungary. However, the club is popular in all over Hungary. Club's main ultras group is Szívtiprók Ultras Debrecen (SZ.U.D.), which is the largest and oldest faction, founded in 1994. As of 2000, SZ.U.D started to divide itself, in factions of ultras outside Debrecen, such as SZ.U.D. Budapest, SZ.U.D. Nagyvárad and SZ.U.D. Hódmezővásárhely. Among smaller groups are considered Force Field, Red Territory and Vadmacskák, which are the oldest. However, since 2009, new ultras factions, such as Sziporkák, Debrecen Hooligans, Barrabrava Debrecen and others appeared. This while several, like North Side Hooligans were dissolved in early 2000s. Debrecen has fierce rivalries with Nyíregyháza, Békéscsaba and competitive rivalries with Ferencváros, Újpest and Videoton.

On 5 August 2014, UEFA issued sanctions against Debrecen, Romania's Steaua București and Slovenia's Maribor following racist behaviour by their fans during 2014–15 UEFA Champions League qualifying against Cliftonville, Strømsgodset and Zrinjski Mostar respectively. Debrecen shut sector B of their ground after fans showed an "illicit banner" during the match against Northern Ireland's Cliftonville.

Szívtiprók Ultras Debrecen (founded in 1994)

Famous supporters
  László Lukács

Ownership
On 27 May 2017, it was announced that Andy Vajna could replace Gábor Szima as the owner of Debrecen. Nevertheless, Andy Vajna added that he likes football but he does not want to invest into football.

On 15 August 2017, it was revealed that Gábor Szima, the owner of Debrecen, might leave the club and a Greek tycoon might arrive.

On 1 July 2020, Szima resigned as the owner of the club. The 73 percent of the shares of the club were purchased by the local government. László Papp, mayor of Debrecen, announced that the main goal is to be promoted to the first league again. Dániel Tőzsér, former footballer, is appointed the director of the club. It was also announced that the budget of the club will be 1.2 billion HUF.

Péter Szabó said that the new management of the club will base its function on business.

On 18 December 2020, it was announced that the DVSC Egyesület purchased the majority of the shares.

On 27 June 2022, Ike Thierry Zaengel was appointed as the chairman of the club.

Honours

Domestic
 Nemzeti Bajnokság I
 Winners (7): 2004–05, 2005–06, 2006–07, 2008–09, 2009–10, 2011–12, 2013–14
 Nemzeti Bajnokság II
 Winners (8): 1942–43, 1948–49, 1959–60, 1961–62, 1978–79, 1988–89, 1992–93, 2020–21
 Runners-up (1): 1983–84
 Magyar Kupa
 Winners (6): 1998–99, 2000–01, 2007–08, 2009–10, 2011–12, 2012–13
 Ligakupa
 Winners (1): 2009–10
 Szuperkupa
 Winners (5): 2005, 2006, 2007, 2009, 2010

Record departures

Players

Current squad
.

Players with multiple nationalities
   Dorian Babunski
   Erik Kusnyír

Out on loan

B squad

Club officials

Board of directors
As of 27 December 2022

Management
As of 27 December 2022

Notable foreign players 

  Stevo Nikolić
  Haris Handžić
  Dorge Kouemaha
  Yannick Mbengono
  Justin Mengolo
  Sandro Tomić
  Ronald Habi
  Božidar Radošević
  Igor Morozov
  Adamo Coulibaly
  Selim Bouadla
  Roguy Méyé
  Kakhaber Chkhetiani
  Dajan Šimac
  Luis Ramos
  Mindaugas Malinauskas
  Aco Stojkov
  Mirsad Mijadinoski
  Bojan Brnović
  Vukašin Poleksić
  Tunde Adeniji
  Liviu Goian
  Tibor Selymes
  Nicolae Ilea 
  Marius Șumudică
  Sabin Ilie
  Ibrahima Sidibe
  Igor Bogdanović
  Dragan Vukmir
  Nenad Novaković
  Dušan Brković
  Róbert Vittek
  Dalibor Volaš
  Rene Mihelič
  Suk Hyun-jun
  Ivan Bobko
  Frank Feltscher

See also
Debreceni VSC in European football
History of Debreceni VSC
List of Debreceni VSC managers
List of Debreceni VSC records and statistics
List of Debreceni VSC seasons

Notes

References

External links

 Official website 

 Detailed international match archive 
 Debreceni VSC Forum 
 Debrecen City – Dombi Tibi elemzés 

 
Football clubs in Hungary
Association football clubs established in 1902
1902 establishments in Hungary
Sports clubs in Debrecen
Railway association football clubs in Hungary